Équateur ("equator") is a 1983 French drama film directed by Serge Gainsbourg, starring Francis Huster. Based on a 1933 novel by Georges Simenon, it was screened out of competition at the 1983 Cannes Film Festival.

Plot

Gabon, the 1930s, then part of French Equatorial Africa. A Frenchman comes to Libreville to work for a timber company; he falls for a mysterious white woman who is involved with murder.

Cast 
 Francis Huster – Timar
 Barbara Sukowa – Adele
 Reinhard Kolldehoff – Eugene Schneider
 François Dyrek – Superintendent
 Jean Bouise – Public prosecutor
 Julien Guiomar – Bouilloux
 Roland Blanche – one-eyed man
 Murray Gronwall – the forester
 Stéphane Bouy – the pedlar
 Franck-Olivier Bonnet – the man from Lyon

References

External links 
 

1983 films
French drama films
Gabonese drama films
1980s French-language films
1983 drama films
Films directed by Serge Gainsbourg
Films based on Belgian novels
Films based on works by Georges Simenon
Films scored by Serge Gainsbourg
Films set in Gabon
1980s French films